MuchDance is a series of pop/dance albums featuring various artists compiled, mixed and released by the Canadian television station MuchMusic, beginning in 1997. It continues a similar series released in association with Quality Records from 1990 to 1997 under the name Muchmusic Dance Mix.

In addition to the ordinary albums in the series, MuchMusic also released albums such as MuchDance 80's (2005) that included classics like Paula Abdul's "Straight Up." There has also been a volume of MuchDance 90s released, along with two #1 hits compilations.

In Quebec, the album were distributed under the name DansePlus until 2019, based upon the former channel, MusiquePlus.

In the United States, Quality Records released the set as Dance Mix USA from 1993 to 1998.

History

Quality released the first Dance Mix album as Dance Mix '90. Two Years later, Muchmusic Dance Mix '92 was released with the Muchmusic logo on the cover and a series of advertisements on the channel. The final album in this series, Dance Mix 1997, was released by Quality without Muchmusic branding. In the United States, Quality, through its co-owned US subsididary Critique/Radikal Records, used featured tracks from "Dance Mix '92" to release the first of eight "Dance Mix USA" compilations, which proved to be popular with American fans through endless television and print campaigns. The last "Dance Mix USA" set released in America was in 1998 through Radikal.

The album MuchDance 1997 was released in 1997.  Starting in 1998, a new edition has since been released every year, with the title of the album reflecting the next year (thus why there is no MuchDance 1998, as the album released that year was released under the title of MuchDance 1999).

The latest album in the series, MuchDance 2021, was released on November 20, 2020.

Albums

Dance Mix '90 

Roxette – "The Look" (1989)
Soul II Soul – "Keep On Movin'" (1989)
Sybil Lynch – "Don't Make Me Over" (1989)
Milli Vanilli – "Girl You Know It's True" (1989)
Black Box – "Ride On Time" (1989)
Inner City – "Big Fun" (1988)
Exposé – "What You Don't Know" (1989)
Company B – "Fascinated" (1987)
Bardeux – "I Love To Bass" (1989)
Rick Astley – "She Wants To Dance With Me" (1988)
Shana – "I Want You" (1989)
Donna Summer – "This Time I Know It's For Real" (1989)
Neneh Cherry – "Kisses On The Wind" (1989)
Yazoo – "Situation" (1983/1989)
Erasure – "Little Respect" (1987)
Figures on a Beach – "You Ain't Seen Nothin' Yet" (1989)
Depeche Mode – "Strange Love" (1988)
Stephen Tin Tin Duffy – "Kiss Me" (1982/1989)

Dance Mix '91

Enigma – "Sadeness (Album Version)" (1989)
Soho – "Hippychick (No Ted Acid Mix)" (1989)
Bell Biv Devoe – "B.B.D. (I Thought It Was Me)? (Extended Version)"
Johnny Gill – "Rub You The Right Way (7" Single Mix)" (1990)
Vanilla Ice – "Ice Ice Baby (Club Mix)" (1990)
MC Hammer – "Pray (7" Single Mix)"
Pet Shop Boys – "So Hard (Extended Dance Mix)"
Jomanda – "Got A Love For You (Hurley's House Mix)"
Black Box – "Everybody Everybody (Le Freak Mix 7" Edit)"
2 In A Room – "Wiggle It (Radio Mix)"
Lisa Stansfield – "This Is The Right Time (Radio Version)"
Leila K – "Got To Get (Extended Mix)"
Snap! – "Ooops Up (The Burn Rubber Remix)"
Candi & The Backbeat – "The World Just Keeps On Turning (12" Club Mix)"
Power Jam – "The Power (Vocal)"

Dance Mix '92

P.M. Dawn – "Set Adrift On Memory Bliss"
Ralph Tresvant – "Sensitivity"
Naughty By Nature – "O.P.P."
Jesus Jones – "Right Here, Right Now"
EMF – "Unbelievable"
Right Said Fred – "I'm Too Sexy"
Black Box – "Strike It Up"
Marky Mark and the Funky Bunch – "Good Vibrations"
Nomad – "(I Wanna Give You) Devotion"
Frankie Knuckles – "The Whistle Song"
Snap! – "Mary Had A Little Boy"
Adamski – "Killer"
KWS – "Please Don't Go (Sunshine Mix)"
Lidell Townsell – "Nu Nu"
Betty Boo – "Doin' The Do"
2 Unlimited – "Twilight Zone"
2 Unlimited – "Get Ready For This"

Dance Mix '93

Unit 3 – "We Are Family"
Bobby Brown – "Humpin' Around"
House Of Pain – "Jump Around"
C+C Music Factory – "Gonna Make You Sweat (Everybody Dance Now)"
The KLF – "3 A.M. Eternal"
Bizarre Inc – "Took My Love"
Technotronic – "Move This"
Snap! – "Rhythm Is A Dancer"
Sarah Washington – "I Will Always Love You"
Lil Suzy – "Take Me In Your Arms"
Tag Team – "Whoomp! (There It Is)"
2 Unlimited – "Tribal Dance"
2 Unlimited – "No Limit"
Dr. Alban – "It's My Life"
Rozalla – "Are You Ready To Fly"
BKS – "Living In "
Arrested Development – "People Everyday"

Dance Mix '94

Enigma – "Return To Innocence"
Captain Hollywood Project – "More & More"
Reel 2 Real – "I Like To Move It"
The Shamen – "Love Sex Intelligence"
Bizarre Inc – "I'm Gonna Get You"
The Goodmen – "Give It Up"
Salt 'N' Pepa – "Shoop"
Snow – "Informer"
Robin S. – "Show Me Love"
Ce Ce Peniston – "Finally"
BKS – "I'm In Love With You (Original Mix)"
Tony Di Bart – "The Real Thing (If I Can't Have You)"
Urban Cookie Collective – "Feels Like Heaven"
Corona – "The Rhythm Of The Night"
MAXX – "Get-A-Way"
2 Unlimited – "The Real Thing"

Dance Mix '95

Whigfield – "Saturday Night"
Livin' Joy – "Dreamer"
Carol Medina – "Tell Me You Love Me"
J.K. – "You & I"
BKS – "Take Control"
Darkness – "In My Dreams"
Bananarama – "Every Shade Of Blue"
Nicki French – "Total Eclipse Of The Heart"
Fun Factory – "Close To You"
N-Trance – "Set You Free"
New System – "This Is The Night"
Technotronic – "Move It To The Rhythm"
Playahitty – "1-2-3! (Train With Me)"
Los del Mar – "Macarena"
Urban Cookie Collective – "Spend The Day"
2 Brothers on the 4th Floor – "Dreams (Will Come Alive)"
Haddaway – "What Is Love"

Dance Mix '96 

Culture Beat – "Inside Out"
BKS – "Astroplane"
Planet Soul – "Feel The Music"
Gusto – "Disco's Revenge"
Cartouche – "Feel The Rain"
Fun Factory – "I Wanna B With U"
Wil Veloz – "Guantanamera"
Pizzaman – "Happiness"
Full Intention – "America (I Love America)"
Reel 2 Real – "Are You Ready For Some More?"
Shaggy – "Boombastic"
Coolio – "Too Hot"
Maria-Lisa – "You Make Me Feel"
Emjay – "In Your Arms"
Capital Sound – "Feel The Rhythm"
Virtualmismo – "Last Train To Universe"
Urban Cookie Collective – "Witness"

Dance Mix '97

Spice Girls – "Say You'll Be There"
Backstreet Boys – "We've Got It Goin' On"
Byron Stingly – "Get Up"
Full Intention – "Shake Your Body(Down To The Ground)"
Ultra Naté – "Free"
Pulse (Featuring the voice of Antoinette Roberson) – "Shadows Of The Past"
The People Movers – "C Lime Woman"
Ebony(Featuring Sensi and Phoebe 1) – "If I Change My Mind" (Fyx Mix)
A Tribe Called Quest – "1nce Again"
Blue Boy – "Remember Me" (Sure is Pure 7" Edit)
Fruit De La Passion – "Tic Tic Tac"
Brainbug – "Nightmare"
Sash! – "Encore Une Fois"
Clueless – "Don't Speak"

MuchDance 1997

The Notorious B.I.G. – "Hypnotize"
LL Cool J – "Doin' It"
Wyclef Jean – "We Trying to Stay Alive"
Robyn – "Do You Know (What It Takes)"
Savage Garden – "I Want You"
Hanson – "MMMBop"
Puff Daddy featuring Faith Evans & 112 – "I'll Be Missing You"
Unique II – "Break My Stride"
Jet Fuel – "Hang On! Here We Go"
U2 – "Discothèque"
Diana King – "I Say a Little Prayer"
The Cardigans – "Love Fool"
Backstreet Boys – "Quit Playing Games (With My Heart)"
OMC – "How Bizarre"
Love Inc. – "Broken Bones"
DJ Company – "Rhythm Of Love"
KRS-One – "Step Into A World"

Note: Was certified 6× Platinum (600,000 units) in Canada on March 17, 1998.

MuchDance 1999

Backstreet Boys – "Everybody (Backstreet's Back)"
N-Trance – "Do Ya Think I'm Sexy? (Radio Edit)"
Ace of Base – "Cruel Summer"
'N Sync – "Tearin' Up My Heart"
Celine Dion – "My Heart Will Go On (Tony Moran Mix)"
All Saints – "Never Ever (Booker T's Vocal Mix) Extended 12" Mix"
Ultra Naté – "Found a Cure (Full Intention Mix)"
Temperance featuring Lorraine Reid – "Hands of Time (Radio Mix)"
Destiny's Child featuring Wyclef Jean – "No, No, No Part 2"
Will Smith – "Just The Two Of Us"
Mase featuring Total – "What You Want"
R. Kelly featuring Keith Murray – "Home Alone (Radio Edit)"
Fatboy Slim – "The Rockafeller Skank"
Love Inc. – "You're a Superstar (City of Love Club Mix)"
Brian McKnight – "Anytime (Cibola Remix Edit)"
Swirl 360 – "Hey Now Now (Dance Pop Radio Edit)"
Savage Garden – "To the Moon and Back"

Note: Was certified 6× Platinum (600,000 units) in Canada on December 1, 1999.

MuchDance 2000

Eminem – "My Name Is"
Jay-Z featuring Amil & Ja Rule – "Can I Get A..."
702 – "Where My Girls At?"
Britney Spears – "...Baby One More Time"
Jennifer Lopez – "If You Had My Love"
Lauryn Hill – "Doo Wop (That Thing)"
BLACKstreet & Janet Jackson featuring Eve & Ja Rule – "Girlfriend/Boyfriend"
P. Diddy featuring Hurricane G – "P.E. 2000"
Len – "Steal My Sunshine"
Will Smith – "Miami"
TLC – "No Scrubs (Hi-Bias Dance Remix)"
Whitney Houston – "It's Not Right, But It's Okay (Thunderpuss Remix)"
Joée – "Arriba"
Ricky Martin – "Livin' La Vida Loca"
Vengaboys – "Boom Boom Boom Boom"
The Boomtang Boys featuring Kim Esty – "Pictures"
Prozzäk – "Strange Disease"

Note: Was certified 7× Platinum (700,000 units) in Canada on October 10, 2000.

MuchDance 2001

Destiny's Child – "Jumpin' Jumpin'"
Toni Braxton – "He Wasn't Man Enough"
'N Sync – "It's Gonna Be Me"
S Club 7 – "S Club Party"
Pink – "There You Go"
Mariah Carey – "Heartbreaker (No Rap Version)"
Eminem – "The Real Slim Shady"
Sisqo – "Thong Song"
Enrique Iglesias – "Be With You"
Christina Aguilera – "I Turn To You (Thunderpuss Remix)"
Britney Spears – "Lucky (Jack D. Elliot Radio Mix)"
Vengaboys – "Shalala Lala"
Dr. Dre featuring Eminem – "Forgot About Dre"
Macy Gray – "I Try (Grand Style Remix)"
Rascalz featuring Barrington Levy & k-os – "Top Of The World"
Jet Fuel featuring Rob Base & DJ E-Z Rock – "Take This Party Higher"
Santana featuring The Product G&B – "Maria Maria (Wyclef Remix)"
soulDecision – "Ooh It's Kinda Crazy"
Backstreet Boys – "The One"
B4-4 – "Get Down"

Note: Was certified 7× Platinum (700,000 units) in Canada on October 22, 2001.

MuchDance 2002

Destiny's Child – "Bootylicious"
Nelly featuring City Spud – "Ride Wit Me"
Jagged Edge featuring Nelly – "Where the Party At"
City High – "What Would You Do?"
Eve featuring Gwen Stefani – "Let Me Blow Ya Mind"
P. Diddy featuring Black Rob and Mark Curry – "Bad Boy For Life"
D12 – "Purple Hills"
Dido – "Thank You (Deep Dish Remix)"
O-Town – "All or Nothing"
Jamiroquai – "Little L"
Backstreet Boys featuring The Neptunes – "The Call" (Remix)
Jessica Simpson featuring Lil' Bow Wow – "Irresistible"
Sugar Jones – "How Much Longer"
Nelly Furtado – "Turn Off The Light"
Joe featuring Mystikal – "Stutter"
Jennifer Lopez – "Love Don't Cost A Thing"
'N Sync – "Pop"

Note: Was certified 4× Platinum (400,000 units) in Canada on May 5, 2003.

MuchDance 2003

Shakira – "Whenever, Wherever"
Nelly – "Hot In Herre"
Pink – "Don't Let Me Get Me (John Shanks Remix)"
Ashanti – "Foolish"
P. Diddy featuring Usher & Loon – "I Need a Girl (Part One)"
Jennifer Lopez featuring Nas – "I'm Gonna Be Alright (Track Masters Remix)"
'N Sync featuring Nelly – "Girlfriend (The Neptunes Remix)"
Mario – "Just A Friend 2002"
Ja Rule featuring Ashanti – "Always On Time"
Rascalz – "Crazy World"
Glenn Lewis – "Don't You Forget It (Remix feat. Paul Cain and DJ Clue)"
Clipse featuring N.O.R.E., Birdman & Lil' Wayne – "Grindin'"
Swollen Members – "Bring It Home"
Moby – "We Are All Made Of Stars (Timo Maas Vocal Remix)"
Enrique Iglesias – "Escape (Giorgio Moroder & Gernando Garibay Club Mix)"
Destiny's Child – "Emotion (The Neptunes Remix)"
Artists For Warchild – "Keep The Beat"

Note: Was certified 2× Platinum (200,000 units) in Canada in February 2004.

MuchDance 2004

Beyoncé featuring Jay-Z – "Crazy In Love"
Justin Timberlake – "Rock Your Body"
50 Cent – "In da Club"
Christina Aguilera – "Fighter"
Hilary Duff – "Why Not"
Kelly Clarkson – "Miss Independent"
Shawn Desman – "Spread My Wings"
Jennifer Lopez featuring LL Cool J – "All I Have"
Keshia Chanté – "Unpredictable"
R. Kelly – "Ignition (Remix)"
Ashanti – "Rock Wit U (Awww Baby)"
Lumidee – "Never Leave You (Uh Oooh, Uh Oooh)"
Nas – "I Can"
Joe Budden featuring Busta Rhymes – "Fire (Yes, Yes Y'all)"
Sean Paul – "Like Glue"
Swollen Members – "Watch This"
Artists For Warchild – "Life"

Note: Was certified 3× Platinum (300,000 units) in Canada on October 21, 2004.

MuchDance 2005

The Black Eyed Peas – "Let's Get It Started"
Britney Spears – "Outrageous"
Beyoncé – "Naughty Girl"
Kanye West – "Jesus Walks"
Jay-Z – "Dirt Off Your Shoulder"
D12 – "How Come"
OutKast – "Roses"
Hilary Duff & Haylie Duff – "Our Lips Are Sealed"
Ashlee Simpson – "Pieces Of Me"
Jennifer Lopez featuring R. Kelly – "Baby I Luv U!"
Christina Milian featuring Fabolous – "Dip It Low"
Keshia Chanté – "Bad Boy"
Mario Winans featuring P. Diddy & Enya – "I Don't Wanna Know"
Terror Squad – "Lean Back"
Lloyd Banks – "On Fire"
Nina Sky featuring Jabba – "Move Ya Body"
Jessica Simpson – "Take My Breath Away (Eddie Biaz remix)"
Fefe Dobson – "Truth Anthem"

Note: Was certified 2× Platinum (200,000 units) in Canada on March 29, 2005.

MuchDance 2006

The Black Eyed Peas – "Don't Phunk With My Heart"
Gwen Stefani – "Hollaback Girl"
The Pussycat Dolls featuring Busta Rhymes – "Don't Cha"
Ciara featuring Ludacris – "Oh"
Eminem – "Mockingbird"
Usher with Alicia Keys – "My Boo"
Destiny's Child – "Girl"
Ludacris featuring Bobby Valentino – "Pimpin' All Over the World"
The Game – "Dreams"
Lindsay Lohan – "Over"
Jesse McCartney featuring Fabolous – "She's No You" (Remix)
Natasha Bedingfield – "These Words"
Tony Yayo featuring 50 Cent – "So Seductive"
Will Smith – "Switch"
Shawn Desman – "Let's Go"
Jully Black featuring Demarco – "Sweat Of Your Brow"
Frankie J. – "How To Deal" (Luny Tunes Reggaeton Remix)
Keshia Chanté – "Ring The Alarm"

Note: Was certified 2× Platinum (200,000 units) in Canada on May 31, 2006.

MuchDance 2007
|
Fergie – "London Bridge"
Chris Brown – "Yo (Excuse Me Miss) (South Rakkas Reggaeton Mix)"
Christina Aguilera – "Ain't No Other Man"
Nelly Furtado featuring Timbaland – "Promiscuous"
The Pussycat Dolls featuring Snoop Dogg – "Buttons"
The Black Eyed Peas – "Pump It"
Chamillionaire featuring Krayzie Bone – "Ridin'"
Busta Rhymes – "Touch It"
Pharrell featuring Gwen Stefani – "Can I Have It Like That"
Shakira featuring Wyclef Jean – "Hips Don't Lie"
Beyoncé – "Check On It"
Kelis featuring Too $hort – "Bossy"
Pink – "Stupid Girls"
Jessica Simpson – "A Public Affair"
Kelly Clarkson – "Walk Away"
Mobile – "Out Of My Head (Claude LeGouche Edit)"
Rihanna – "S.O.S. (Rescue Me)" (Nevin's Future - Retro Edit)"
Mylo – "Mars Needs Women"

MuchDance 2008

Justin Timberlake – "LoveStoned / I Think She Knows"
Hilary Duff – "Stranger"
Nelly Furtado – "Do It"
Kat DeLuna featuring Elephant Man – "Whine Up"
will.i.am – "I Got It From My Mama"
Sean Kingston – "Beautiful Girls"
Gwen Stefani featuring Damian "Jr. Gong" Marley – "Now That You Got It"
Belly featuring Ginuwine – "Pressure"
Fergie featuring Sean Kingston – "Big Girls Don't Cry (Personal)" (Remix)
Timbaland featuring Nelly Furtado & Justin Timberlake – "Give It To Me"
T-Pain featuring Yung Joc – "Buy U A Drank (Shawty Snappin')"
Rihanna featuring Jay-Z – "Umbrella"
Kanye West – "Can't Tell Me Nothing"
50 Cent – "Amusement Park"
Christina Aguilera – "Candyman"
Avril Lavigne featuring Lil' Mama – "Girlfriend" (Remix)
Tiga – "You Gonna Want Me"
Pink – "U + Ur Hand"

Note: Was certified Platinum (100,000 units) in Canada on July 27, 2009.

MuchDance 2009

Rihanna – "Disturbia"
Lady Gaga featuring Colby O'Donis – "Just Dance (HCCR's Bambossa Remix)"
The Pussycat Dolls – "When I Grow Up (Ralphi Rosario Radio Remix)"
Ne-Yo – "Closer"
Chris Brown – "Forever"
Britney Spears – "Break The Ice"
Danny Fernandes featuring Belly – "Private Dancer"
Classified – "Hard To be Hip Hop"
Kanye West featuring Dwele – "Flashing Lights"
Girlicious – "Like Me"
Leona Lewis – "Bleeding Love"
Jordin Sparks featuring Chris Brown – "No Air (DJ Swerve Remix)"
Shiloh – "Operator (A Girl Like Me)"
Avril Lavigne – "The Best Damn Thing"
Metro Station – "Shake It"
Lil Wayne featuring Static Major – "Lollipop"
Usher featuring Young Jeezy – "Love In This Club (Reavers Remix)"

Note: Was certified 2× Platinum (160,000 units) in Canada on March 9, 2009.

MuchDance 2010

The Black Eyed Peas – "I Gotta Feeling"
Sean Kingston – "Fire Burning"
Pitbull – "Hotel Room Service"
Cascada – "Evacuate The Dancefloor"
Classified – "Anybody Listening"
Kelly Clarkson – "I Do Not Hook Up (Bimbo Jones Remix)"
David Guetta featuring Kelly Rowland – "When Love Takes Over"
Jonas Brothers – "Paranoid (Soul Seekers Remix)"
Katy Perry – "Waking Up In Vegas (Manhattan Clique Remix)"
Britney Spears – "If U Seek Amy"
P!nk – "Funhouse"
Wale featuring Lady Gaga – "Chillin'"
Ciara featuring Justin Timberlake – "Love Sex Magic"
Lady Gaga – "Paparazzi"
Misstress Barbara featuring Sam Roberts – "I'm Running (Radio Mix)"
Stereos featuring J. Paris – "Throw Ya Hands Up"
Belly featuring Snoop Dogg – "Hot Girl"

Note: Was certified 2× Platinum (160,000 units) in Canada on March 31, 2010.

MuchDance 2011

Usher featuring Pitbull – "DJ Got Us Fallin' In Love"
Katy Perry – "Teenage Dream (Vandalism Le Pop Mix)"
Enrique Iglesias featuring Pitbull – "I Like It"
Adam Lambert – "If I Had You"
Justin Bieber – "Somebody to Love"
Flo Rida featuring David Guetta – "Club Can't Handle Me"
Jay Sean featuring Nicki Minaj – "2012 (It Ain't the End)"
Far East Movement featuring The Cataracs and Dev – "Like A G6"
Ke$ha – "Your Love Is My Drug"
Taio Cruz – "Dynamite"
Lady Gaga – "Eh, Eh (Nothing Else I Can Say)"
Dragonette – "Easy (Buffet Libre Remix)"
Selena Gomez & the Scene – "Round and Round"
Mike Posner – "Cooler Than Me"
Fefe Dobson – "Ghost"
Nicki Minaj featuring will.i.am – "Check It Out"

MuchDance 2012

LMFAO featuring Lauren Bennett and GoonRock – "Party Rock Anthem"
Pitbull – "Give Me Everything"
Britney Spears – "I Wanna Go"
David Guetta featuring Nicki Minaj and Flo Rida – "Where Them Girls At"
Maroon 5 featuring Christina Aguilera – "Moves Like Jagger"
Lady Gaga – "The Edge of Glory"
Cobra Starship featuring Sabi – "You Make Me Feel..."
The Black Eyed Peas – "Don't Stop the Party"
Foster the People – "Pumped Up Kicks (Gigamesh Remix)"
Beyoncé – "Run the World (Girls) (Billionaire Remix)"
Nicki Minaj – "Super Bass"
Kay – "My Name Is Kay"
Anjulie – "Brand New Chick"
Selena Gomez & The Scene – "Love You Like a Love Song"
Rihanna – "Cheers (Drink to That)"
Chris Brown – "She Ain't You"

Note: Was certified 2× Platinum (160,000 units) in Canada on February 27, 2013.

MuchDance 2013

PSY – "Gangnam Style"
Nicki Minaj – "Pound the Alarm"
Katy Perry – "Wide Awake (Kaskade Radio Edit)"
David Guetta featuring Chris Brown and Lil Wayne – "I Can Only Imagine"
Pitbull – "Back in Time"
Usher – "Scream"
Chris Brown – "Don't Wake Me Up"
Ne-Yo – "Let Me Love You (Until You Learn to Love Yourself)"
Demi Lovato – "Give Your Heart a Break (The Alias Radio Edit)"
Nikki Williams – "Glowing"
Ellie Goulding – "Lights (Fernando Garibay Remix)"
P!nk – "Blow Me (One Last Kiss)"
Flo Rida – "Whistle"
Maroon 5 – "One More Night"
One Direction – "One Thing"
Drake featuring Lil Wayne – "The Motto"
Justin Bieber featuring Big Sean – "As Long As You Love Me"

MuchDance 2014

Robin Thicke featuring Pharrell – "Blurred Lines (No Rap Version)"
Avicii – "Wake Me Up"
Miley Cyrus – "We Can't Stop"
Selena Gomez – "Come & Get It"
Justin Timberlake – "Mirrors"
Lady Gaga – "Applause"
Drake featuring Majid Jordan – "Hold On, We're Going Home"
Classified featuring David Myles – "Inner Ninja"
Bruno Mars – "Treasure"
Emblem3 – "Chloe (You're the One I Want)"
David Guetta featuring Ne-Yo and Akon – "Play Hard"
Lana Del Rey – "Summertime Sadness (Cedric Gervais Remix)"
Calvin Harris featuring Ayah Marar – "Thinking About You"
PRTY H3RO – "Life of the PRTY"
Bonnie McKee – "American Girl"
Ellie Goulding – "Burn"

MuchDance 2015

Meghan Trainor – "All About That Bass"
Maroon 5 – "Maps"
Ariana Grande featuring Iggy Azalea – "Problem"
Iggy Azalea featuring Charli XCX – "Fancy"
Ed Sheeran – "Sing"
Nicki Minaj – "Anaconda"
Jessie J featuring Ariana Grande and Nicki Minaj – "Bang Bang"
Pitbull featuring John Ryan – "Fireball"
MAGIC! – "Rude (Zedd Remix)"
Sia – "Chandelier (Liam Keegan Radio Edit)"
Calvin Harris – "Summer"
Katy Perry – "Birthday (Cash Cash Radio Mix)"
Shawn Hook – "Million Ways (Hi Class Weapon Remix)"
Kiesza – "Hideaway"
Disclosure featuring Sam Smith – "Latch"
Pharrell Williams – "Happy"

Note: Was certified Platinum (80,000 units) in Canada on March 16, 2015.

MuchDance 2016

Calvin Harris & Disciples – "How Deep Is Your Love"
Hailee Steinfeld – "Love Myself"
WALK THE MOON – "Shut Up and Dance"
R. City – "Locked Away (featuring. Adam Levine)"
Major Lazer & DJ Snake – "Lean On (featuring. MØ)"
Maroon 5 – "This Summer's Gonna Hurt Like a Motherfucker"
Fifth Harmony – "Worth It (featuring. Kid Ink)"
Rachel Platten  – "Fight Song (Dave Aude Remix)"
Demi Lovato – "Cool For The Summer"
Pitbull – "Fun (featuring. Chris Brown)"
Ed Sheeran – "Photograph (Felix Jaehn Remix)"
X Ambassadors – "Renegades (Stash Konig Remix)"
Zedd – "Beautiful Now (featuring. Jon Bellion)"
David Guetta – "Hey Mama (featuring. Nicki Minaj, Bebe Rexha & Afrojack)"
Selena Gomez – "Good For You (featuring. A$AP Rocky)"
Silentó – "Watch Me (Whip / Nae Nae)"

MuchDance 2017

Major Lazer featuring Justin Bieber & MØ – "Cold Water"
DJ Snake featuring Justin Bieber – "Let Me Love You"
Sia featuring Sean Paul – "Cheap Thrills"
P!nk – "Just Like Fire (Wideboys Remix)"
The Chainsmokers featuring Daya – "Don't Let Me Down"
Shawn Mendes – "Treat You Better"
Fifth Harmony featuring Ty Dolla $ign – "Work from Home"
Ariana Grande  – "Into You"
Meghan Trainor – "Me Too"
Kungs & Cookin' on 3 Burners – "This Girl"
Ruth B – "Lost Boy (Cotone Remix)"
Charlie Puth featuring Selena Gomez – "We Don't Talk Anymore"
Tove Lo – "Cool Girl"
Tory Lanez – "LUV"
Alan Walker – "Faded"
Britney Spears featuring G-Eazy – "Make Me..."

MuchDance 2018

P!nk – "What About Us"
Katy Perry – "Swish Swish"
Shawn Mendes – "There's Nothing Holdin' Me Back (NOTD Remix)"
Selena Gomez – "Fetish (Galantis Remix)"
Imagine Dragons – "Believer (Kaskade Remix)"
Khalid featuring Marshmello – "Silence (Tiestos Big Room Remix)"
French Montana – "Unforgettable"
Calvin Harris – "Feels"
J Balvin featuring Willy William – "Mi Gente"
Camila Cabello – "Havana"
Liam Payne – "Strip That Down"
Zedd featuring Liam Payne – "Get Low"
OneRepublic featuring SeeB – "Rich Love"
Khalid – "Young, Dumb & Broke"
Demi Lovato – "Sorry Not Sorry"
Kesha – "Praying (Frank Walker Remix)"

MuchDance 2019

Ariana Grande – "No Tears Left To Cry"
Calvin Harris featuring Dua Lipa – "One Kiss"
Imagine Dragons – "Thunder"
The Weeknd featuring Kendrick Lamar – "Pray For Me"
The Chainsmokers – "Side Effects"
Bebe Rexha featuring Florida Georgia Line – "Meant To Be"
5 Seconds of Summer – "Youngblood"
Loud Luxury – "Love No More"
Jonas Blue featuring Jack & Jack – "Rise"
Migos – "Stir Fry"
Martin Garrix featuring Khalid – "Ocean"
Tiesto featuring Dzeko, Preme, and Post Malone – "Jackie Chan"
Khalid featuring Normani – "Love Lies"
Clean Bandit featuring Demi Lovato – "Solo"
Dennis Lloyd – "Nevermind"
bülow – "Not a Love Song"
Tyler Shaw – "Cautious"

MuchDance 2020

Lil Nas X featuring Billy Ray Cyrus – "Old Town Road"
Ariana Grande – "Break Up with Your Girlfriend, I'm Bored"
The Chainsmokers & Illenium featuring Lennon Stella – "Takeaway"
Jonas Brothers – "Sucker"
Loud Luxury & Bryce Vine – "I'm Not Alright"
Shawn Mendes – "If I Can't Have You"
Ellie Goulding, Diplo & Swae Lee – "Close To Me"
Y2K & bbno$ – "Lalala"
Sam Smith & Normani – "Dancing With a Stranger"
Khalid – "Talk"
Kygo & Whitney Houston – "Higher Love"
Regard – "Ride It"
Mabel – "Don't Call Me Up"
Martin Garrix featuring Macklemore and Patrick Stump – "Summer Days"
Mark Ronson featuring Camila Cabello – "Find U Again"
Famba – "Swear To God"

MuchDance 2021

Lady Gaga featuring Ariana Grande – "Rain On Me"
Saint Jhn – "Roses (Imanbek Remix)"
Jawsh 685 featuring Jason Derulo – "Savage Love (Laxed - Siren Beat)"
Topic featuring A7S – "Breaking Me"
Katy Perry	– "Daisies (Oliver Heldens Remix)"
Jonas Brothers featuring Karol G – "X"
Loud Luxury – "Cold Feet"
Lewis Capaldi – "Before You Go (Edessa Remix)"
Niall Horan featuring Diplo – "Nice to Meet Ya (Diplo Remix)"
Rosalía featuring Travis Scott – "TKN"
J. Balvin, Dua Lipa, Bad Bunny, and Tainy – "Un Día (One Day)"
Nea – "Some Say (Felix Jaehn Remix)"
24kGoldn featuring Iann Dior – "Mood"
Surf Mesa and Topic featuring Emilee – "ILY (I Love You Baby) (Topic Remix)"
StaySolidRocky – "Party Girl"
Young T & Bugsey featuring Headie One – "Don't Rush"
Surfaces – "Sunday Best"
BENEE featuring Gus Dapperton – "Supalonely"

MuchDance 2022

The Kid Laroi and Justin Bieber – "Stay"
Marshmello and Jonas Brothers - "Leave Before You Love Me"
Doja Cat - "Woman"
Justin Bieber feat. Daniel Caesar and Giveon - "Peaches"
Lil Nas X - "Thats What I Want"
Glass Animals - "Heat Waves"
Farruko - "Pepas"
Loud Luxury - "Holiday Hills"
Meduza feat. Dermot Kennedy - "Paradise"
Kane Brown x "Blackbear" - "Memory"
Tai Verdes - "A-O-K"
Chlöe - "Have Mercy"
Lost Frequencies, "Calum Scott - "Where Are You Now"
Young Bombs feat. JORDY - "Summer In Brooklyn"
Tyler Shaw - "When You're Home"

MuchDance #1's

Justin Timberlake featuring Clipse – "Like I Love You"
Kelis – "Milkshake"
The Black Eyed Peas – "My Humps"
Rihanna – "Pon De Replay"
Nelly – "Hot In Herre"
50 Cent – "In Da Club"
Beyoncé featuring Jay-Z – "Crazy In Love"
Britney Spears – "Toxic"
Gwen Stefani – "What You Waiting For?"
The Killers – "Somebody Told Me"
Bodyrockers – "I Like The Way"
Pink – "Get The Party Started"
Kelly Clarkson – "Since U Been Gone"
Hilary Duff – "Come Clean"
Maroon 5 – "This Love"
Shaggy featuring RikRok – "It Wasn't Me"
Jagged Edge featuring Run – "Let's Get Married"
Outkast – "Hey Ya"

MuchDance #1's Volume 2

Amerie – "1 Thing"
Chris Brown featuring Juelz Santana – "Run It!"
Sean Paul – "Get Busy"
Usher – "Caught Up"
Justin Timberlake featuring Timbaland – "SexyBack"
Daft Punk – "One More Time"
Ashlee Simpson – "Boyfriend"
Fergie featuring will.i.am – "Fergalicious"
Nelly Furtado – "Maneater" (Remix)
The Killers – "Mr. Brightside"
Mariah Carey – "Shake It Off"
k-os – "Crabbuckit"
Keshia Chanté – "2U"
50 Cent featuring Olivia – "Candy Shop"
Snoop Dogg featuring Pharrell – "Drop It Like It's Hot"
Mary J. Blige – "Family Affair"
Mario – "Let Me Love You"
Ne-Yo – "So Sick"

MuchDance 90's

Disc 1:
Aqua – "Barbie Girl" (1997)
Real McCoy – "Another Night" (1994/1995)
Haddaway – "What Is Love" (1993)
MC Hammer- "U Can't Touch This" (1990)
C+C Music Factory – "Gonna Make You Sweat (Everybody Dance Now)" (1990)
Spice Girls – "Wannabe" (1996)
Ace of Base – "The Sign" (1994)
SWV – "Right Here/Human Nature" (1992)
Snow – "Informer" (1993/1998)
Shaggy – "Oh Carolina" (1995)
Robin S. – "Show Me Love" (1996)
Nightcrawlers – "Push The Feeling On (The Dub Of Doom)" (1994)
Crystal Waters – "Gypsy Woman (She's Homeless)" (1993)
Faithless – "Insomnia (Armand's European Vacation Mix)" (1995)
Intonation featuring Joée – "(I Just) Died In Your Arms" (1993)

Disc 2:
Snap! – "Rhythm Is A Dancer" (1991)
Black Box – "Everybody Everybody" (1991)
Deee-Lite – "Groove Is In The Heart" (1990)
CeCe Peniston – "Finally" (1992)
Vanilla Ice – "Ice Ice Baby" (1990)
Salt-N-Pepa – "Let's Talk About Sex" (1992)
Montell Jordan – "This Is How We Do It" (1995)
House of Pain – "Jump Around" (1992)
Ini Kamoze – "Here Comes The Hotstepper" (1993)
Naughty by Nature – "Hip Hop Hooray" (1994)
DNA featuring Suzanne Vega – "Tom's Diner" (1997)
The Movement – "Jump!" (1998)
Le Click – "Tonight Is The Night" (1990)
Culture Beat – "Mr. Vain" (1993)
Jam & Spoon – "Right in the Night (Fall in Love with Music)" (1996)

MuchDance 80's

Disc 1:
Wham! – "Wake Me Up Before You Go-Go" (1985)
Culture Club – "Karma Chameleon" (1984)
Paula Abdul – "Straight Up" (1989)
New Kids On The Block – "You Got It (The Right Stuff)" (1989)
Bobby Brown – "My Prerogative" (1988)
Grandmaster Flash & Melle Mel – "White Lines (Don't Do It)" (1987)
Rob Base & DJ E-Z Rock – "It Takes Two" (1987)
New Edition – "Cool It Now" (1986)
Cameo – "Word Up" (1982)
M/A/R/R/S – "Pump Up The Volume" (1987)
Taylor Dayne – "Tell It To My Heart" (1987)
Chaka Khan – "I Feel For You" (1984)
Jermaine Stewart – "We Don't Have To Take Our Clothes Off" (1987)
Sheila E. – "The Glamorous Life" (1984)
Debbie Gibson – "Only In My Dreams" (1986)

Disc 2:
Rick Astley – "Never Gonna Give You Up" (1987)
Cyndi Lauper – "Girls Just Want To Have Fun" (1984)
Dead Or Alive – "You Spin Me 'Round (Like A Record)" (1985)
Salt-N-Pepa – "Push It" (1987)
Aerosmith with Run-DMC – "Walk This Way" (1985)
DJ Jazzy Jeff & The Fresh Prince – "Parents Just Don't Understand" (1987)
Club Nouveau – "Lean On Me" (1986)
UB40 – "Red Red Wine" (1982)
Musical Youth – "Pass The Dutchie" (1983)
Jimmy Cliff – "Reggae Nights" (1980)
Bananarama – "Cruel Summer" (1985)
Jody Watley – "Looking For A New Love" (1986)
Exposé – "Point Of No Return" (1988)
Rick James – "Give It To Me Baby" (1981)
Soul II Soul featuring Caron Wheeler – "Back To Life (However Do You Want Me)" (1989/1990)

Note: Was certified Gold (50,000 units) in Canada on June 13, 2005.

See also
Big Shiny Tunes

References

Compilation album series
Much (TV channel)
Dance-pop compilation albums
2000s compilation albums
1990s compilation albums